Hallelesis is a butterfly genus from the subfamily Satyrinae in the family Nymphalidae.

Species
Hallelesis asochis (Hewitson, 1866)
Hallelesis halyma (Fabricius, 1793)

External links 
 "Hallelesis Condamin, 1961" at Markku Savela's Lepidoptera and Some Other Life Forms

Elymniini
Butterfly genera